Dime Spasov (born 7 May 1985 in Skopje) is a Macedonian politician, the former Minister of Labor and Social Policy of the Republic of Macedonia in the government of Nikola Gruevski. He is member of the party VMRO-DPMNE.

References

1985 births
Foreign Ministers of North Macedonia
Living people
Diplomats from Skopje
Politicians from Skopje
Ss. Cyril and Methodius University of Skopje alumni